The Knight of the Dragon,  Star Knight, is a 1985 Spanish adventure film directed by Fernando Colomo. It stars Miguel Bosé alongside Klaus Kinski, Harvey Keitel and Fernando Rey.

Plot 
A knight sets out to rescue a princess from a dragon, but the dragon turns out to really be an alien spacecraft.

Cast

Production
The film had initially a 200 million pesetas budget, and received an additional 50% subsidy. Eventually the budget had to be raised to 300 million, making for a 400 million total (equal to about $4 million USD, adjusted for inflation), the highest in Spanish cinema at the time.

Casting
Imanol Arias was initially chosen for the alien's role, and the actor liked the idea, but it was eventually decided that he wasn't suitable for the character. Looking for a more androgynous profile, he was replaced by Miguel Bosé.

For alchemist Boecius the staff was interested in signing a former Hollywood star. The producers successively tried to sign Burt Lancaster, Charlton Heston, Kirk Douglas and Robert Mitchum. An agreement with Vincent Price fell through due to surgery, and his agent offered them Klaus Kinski instead.

Filming
The film was shot through the province of Girona. The crew was set in Roses, and the Requesens Castle and the volcanic landscape around Olot were used. The shooting is mostly remembered for the tense relationship between Kinski and most of the cast and crew. According to Fernando Colomo, having to wait on a horse for a while angered him for the rest of the entire production and he was disrespectful to everyone except for Miguel Bosé and the Roma people who took care of the animals used in the film.

Release
The film was theatrically released in Spain on 20 December 1985. After the film's theatrical run in its native Spain, CineTel Films picked up the film for a US theatrical release in the summer of 1986. However, the film was not released on videocassette in the US until 1992, when it was released by Vidmark Entertainment.

Reception
The film was the seventh most attended Spanish film in 1985, far from the box office performance expected to make up for its record budget. The production also resulted in a dispute with the American distributors, which broke off their contract following a delay. Colomo was left with a 50 million pesetas debt that he covered with the gains from his next film, La vida alegre.

See also 
 List of Spanish films of 1985

References

External links

1985 films
1980s science fiction adventure films
Spanish science fiction adventure films
1980s Spanish-language films
Films directed by Fernando Colomo
Films set in the Middle Ages
Films shot in the province of Girona